Startin' from Scratch: How a Thug Was Born is the fifth studio album by Layzie Bone. The album is available with a bonus DVD.  Some tracks have been removed and replaced with other tracks.  Among the guest performers on this album are 2Pac, Eazy-E, and Flesh-n-Bone.

Track listing

References

2007 albums
Layzie Bone albums